{{DISPLAYTITLE:C2115H3252N556O673S16}}
The molecular formula C2115H3252N556O673S16 (molar mass: 47,750 g/mol) may refer to:

 Certolizumab pegol
 Lumiliximab

Molecular formulas